Rangula Ratnam is a 2018 Indian Telugu-language romantic drama film starring Raj Tarun  and Chitra Shukla.

Plot 
Vishnu (Raj Tarun) is a software engineer who is attached to his widowed mother (Sithara). He falls in love with Keerthi (Chitra Shukla). Keerthi is a stickler for traffic rules and annoys Vishnu. Vishnu life turns upside down when his mom dies in sleep from a hidden illness. Vishnu is miserable and can't recover from his mom's death. Vishnu proposes to Keerthi. Keerthi goes to a camp from where she calls him and accepts his love. Vishnu goes to the camp and brings Keerthi back. On the way back, they profess love for each other. After a near death experience when Vishnu stops for a cigarette break, she is scared of losing Vishnu. When Vishnu stops at a tea stall near her home, she cuts him off saying she is not interested in love, marriage etc. She leaves and stops responding to Vishnu's calls. When he tries to reach out, Keerthi says she loves him but doesn't want any relationship indicating a past story. One evening, Keerthi comes to Vishnu's house and tells she is scared. She reveals that her loving dad dies in a bus accident on her birthday. She is fearful of relationships because of the fear of losing them. Vishnu takes her to the temple and assures her God will take care of them and asks her to marry him. She is assured and they start enjoying each other's company. Keerthi starts being too concerned with safety of Vishnu pushing his buttons. Vishnu and his friend get into a fight with some local youth and ends up drinking with them. Meanwhile, Keerthi is worried sick about this and catches Vishnu's lies. On a trip to country side for his friend's kid's naming ceremony, this overbearing nature of Keerthi becomes too much for Vishnu. To add to the woes, An astrologer predicts that night travel might be dangerous for a month for Vishnu. They take a bus away from the group back to the city. Vishnu breaks up from Keerthi over this restricting nature of Keerthi. Keerthi slowly realises her mistake and apologizes to a still miffed Vishnu. Vishnu finds solace in his mom's voice notes and realises Keerthi takes care of him exactly like his mom and that he needs her back. He goes to Keerthi's house to find her house locked and the household gone to a wedding. Fearing it is Keerthi's wedding, Vishnu reaches the venue to find to his relief that is not Keerthi's wedding. He makes up with Keerthi asking her to continue being protective of him.

Cast 

Raj Tarun as Vishnu
Chitra Shukla as Keerthi
Sithara as Vishnu's mother
Priyadarshi as Vishnu's friend
Ravi Prakash as Keerthi's father
Ravi Siva Teja

Production 
Raj Tarun and Chitra Shukla were signed to play the leads while veteran actress Sithara was brought in to play a pivotal role. The film is produced by Annapoorna Studios and was scheduled to release on 14 January, coinciding with Sankranthi. The film is directed by Shreeranjani, who previously worked as an assistant to Selvaraghavan for the Tamil film, 7G Rainbow Colony (2004). After writing a song for Kittu Unnadu Jagratha (2017), Raj Tarun also wrote a song for this film.

Soundtrack 
The songs were composed by Sricharan Pakala.

Release 
The film had a below average run at the box office.

The Times of India gave the film a rating of two out of five stars and wrote that "Rangula Raatnam is old wine in an antique bottle and it doesn’t even pretend to be otherwise!". Telangana Today wrote that "Though director Shreeranjani has a rather slim plot, her narrative lacing different elements such as mother-son bonding, contrasting approaches seeking a common ground and friendships and relations, is appreciable".

Home media 
The satellite rights of the film were acquired by Zee Telugu.

References

External links 

 Indian romantic drama films
2010s Telugu-language films
2018 romantic drama films
Films scored by Sricharan Pakala